The music for the 2018 HBO satirical black comedy-drama television series Succession, is composed by Nicholas Britell. It is considered as a combination of "hip hop and classical music" approaching the life style of Kendall Roy's mindset, his entry in corporate business, and obsession over rap music, which led hip hop being a major influence in the show. The score albums for each seasons were distributed by Republic Records, WaterTower Music and Milan Records. Britell's score, along with the main title theme, received critical acclaim and several accolades.

Overview 
Nicholas Britell was hired to score the television series' music, referred by director and executive producer Adam McKay, who previously worked with him in The Big Short (2015) and Vice (2018). It was his first scoring stint for a television series. Though he understood the musical language of being distinctive from the show's satirical elements, he however, being tried not to be musically funny, because "as soon as the music says this is funny, all the humor is drained [...] Getting darker makes it funny, and that’s what I leaned into — this counterpoint." Hence he approached a lot of the writing of the music as "imagining what the Roy family might imagine for themselves".

He wrote a dark classical score based on the late-18th century music, which had infused with hip-hop beats, using a Roland TR-808 drummed machine, detuned piano, modern filters and samples, which is music for "delusions of Kendall Roy (Jeremy Strong), who has a predilection for rap, but intentionally exaggerated". He sampled an initial part of the score to infuse with hip hop beats. Some of the score had consisted of cohesive, song-like variations of main themes instead of cues being directed for the actions, situations and characters. He was fascinated by finding strange sounds that are linked through the show. While mixing bass in the score, Britell "always turn it up a little ‘too much’, because that feels right to him for the show" while also experimenting piano, bells, strings and percussions.

In the second season, the album featured a rap song "24 L to the OG" performed by Strong himself, to depict Roy's rap obsession. The song was written by Britell himself as the showrunner Jesse Armstrong told him "Kendall was going to perform a rap for his father – because of course he would. Kendall doing a rap for Logan in itself is going to be a cringeworthy event, but if it’s just cringeworthy and falls flat then it doesn’t really work. It needs to be cringeworthy and well-executed [...] Kendall is basically the same age as I am and most people form their musical predilections in college, so I thought it would be really [funny] to take a beat [I wrote] from that time, that probably would represent Kendall’s tastes too." Strong asked him to record the demo of it and had practiced the vocals, which was finalised. Britell appreciated his performance in both acting and singing, saying "To rap a sequence like that is not easy and requires a whole rhythm sensibility. It’s a very different skill set from acting. I think he did an incredible job."

The third season had influences of Italian classical music, hence Britell went to Tuscany to study the musical tradition (where the series actually takes place). In some cues, the score had "the timelessness of that part of the world, the history and how that parallels with the sort of current mythmaking that the Roy family has of themselves at the same moment in time." As a result, he had the scope to explore grandeur for the sequences in the location, as well as its cues. He added that, the FBI raid in the third episode, is proabably "one of the largest [cues] certainly up to that moment".

Main title 

The main title theme was composed using classical piano layered with hip-hop beats. He used beats from TR-808, along with strings and brass, and woven the percussive instruments into the theme, to create a dissonant sound. The theme song was released as a single on July 20, 2018. It has been opened to acclaim from critics and fans, which led to its increase in popularity over the theme song, and has included several memes, remixes and fan projects, attributing its popularity. An official remix of the song by rapper Pusha T was released on October 2019.

Soundtrack albums

Season 1 
Succession: Season 1 (HBO Original Series Soundtrack) is the soundtrack to the first season of the television series, released on August 9, 2019 by Milan Records. The album was preceded by the single—the main title theme, released earlier on July 2018.

Season 2 
Succession: Season 2 (HBO Original Series Soundtrack) is the soundtrack to the second season of the television series, released on May 22, 2020 by WaterTower Music. The album was preceded by the single—"24 L to the OG", performed by Jeremy Strong.

Season 3 
Succession: Season 3 (HBO Original Series Soundtrack) is the soundtrack to the third season of the television series, released on April 29, 2022 by Republic Records.

Accolades

References 

2019 soundtrack albums
2020 soundtrack albums
2022 soundtrack albums
Republic Records soundtracks
Milan Records soundtracks
WaterTower Music soundtracks
Television soundtracks